Jinling College may refer to:

 Ginling College, also romanized as Jinling
 Jinling College, Nanjing University